Clint Sipho Sephadi (born 22 May 1973) is a South African retired professional footballer who last played as a midfielder for Winners Park. He formerly played for Wits University and Jomo Cosmos and has 7 caps for the South African Under-23s team.

External links
Jomo Cosmos profile

1973 births
Living people
South African soccer players
Bidvest Wits F.C. players
Jomo Cosmos F.C. players
Winners Park F.C. players
Association football midfielders